The 2001 Armenian Cup was the tenth edition of the Armenian Cup, a football competition. In 2001, the tournament had 16 participants, none of which were reserve teams.

Results

First round
The first legs were played on 7 and 8 April 2001. The second legs were played on 12 and 13 April 2001.

|}

Quarter-finals
The first legs were played on 22 April 2001. The second legs were played on 27 April 2001.

|}

Shirak was awarded a walkover, as Kilikia did not play out of protest against not having their 1st round league match vs Pyunik (who fielded an ineligible player and were fined) awarded to them

Semi-finals
The first legs were played on 3 and 4 May 2001. The second legs were played on 12 and 13 May 2001.

|}

Final

See also
 2001 Armenian Premier League

External links
 2001 Armenian Cup at rsssf.com

Armenian Cup seasons
Armenia
Armenian Cup, 2001